Ypsilothuriidae is a family of sea cucumbers belonging to the order Dendrochirotida.

Genera:
 Echinocucumis Sars, 1859
 Tripuscucumis Reich, 2003
 Ypsilocucumis Panning, 1949
 Ypsilothuria Perrier, 1886

References

Dendrochirotida
Echinoderm families